Sarjoo Gowreesunkur was the Mauritius national football team coach in 1996 and 2006. He has also been a player and coach of Sunrise Flacq United in the 1990s. He resigned from the position coach in August 2007 following the poor performance of the national team during the Indian Ocean Games. He was later coach of AS Port-Louis 2000 and Curepipe Starlight SC. He now hosts a talk show about football on the radio in Mauritius.

Playing career 

Sarjoo Gowreesunkur played with 3 different clubs, including Hindu Cadets, Fire Brigade SC and Sunrise Flacq United during 10 years (1979–1989)  as a centre back. He has been called several times to play for the national team. He was the youngest captain of the Mauritius national football team  in 1984 at the age of 23. He had to stop his career in 1989 due to injury.

Awards

Individual 
 Coach of the Year (team sports): 2006

References

Mauritian football managers
Mauritian footballers
Mauritius national football team managers
Living people
Association football central defenders
Year of birth missing (living people)